

The Flanders F.2 was a 1910s British experimental single-seat monoplane aircraft designed and built by Richard Leonard Howard-Flanders and later converted to a two-seater as the Flanders F.3.

Development
Howard Flanders had been an assistant to A.V.Roe when he decided to design his own aircraft. In 1910 he could not get an appropriate engine for it. He started again on another monoplane design, the Flanders F.2 powered by a 60 hp (45 kW) Green engine. The F.2 was a single-seat shoulder-wing monoplane.  The wing as usual for the period was braced by wires and kingposts. It had a fixed tailskid landing gear with bicycle-type wheels and a central skid projecting forward from between the wheels. The central skid was to stop the aircraft nosing over on rough ground. It flew for the first time on 8 August 1911.

Later in 1911 the aircraft was modified to include another cockpit forward of the pilot for a passenger. The  wingspan was increased and the modified aircraft was re-designated the Flanders F.3. It flew successfully for a number of months until it was destroyed in a fatal accident on 13 May 1912 when Mr. E.V.B Fisher was piloting it with an American passenger Mr. Mason when it crashed at Brooklands killing them both. In 1912 the War Office ordered four monoplanes based on the F.3 and designated the Flanders F.4.

Variants
F.1
Unbuilt experimental monoplane
F.2
Single-seat monoplane powered by a 60hp (45 kW) Green engine.
F.3
F.2 modified as a two-seater with increased wingspan to 42 ft 0 in (12.80m).

Specifications (F.2)

See also

References

 The Illustrated Encyclopedia of Aircraft (Part Work 1982-1985), 1985, Orbis Publishing

External links

1910s British experimental aircraft
F02
Single-engined tractor aircraft
Shoulder-wing aircraft
Aircraft first flown in 1911